Zlatko Ivaylov Bonev (born 8 April 1994) is a Bulgarian retired footballer, who plays as a midfielder.

Career

Ludogorets Razgrad
Bonev joined the reserve team of Ludogorets for their first season in B group. After two matches he was called up to the 1st team. On 23 September 2015 he made his debut for Ludogorets first team in a match against Lokomotiv 1929 Mezdra for the Bulgarian Cup, won by Ludogorets by 5:0, but at the end of the year he was released from the team.

Lokomotiv 2012 Mezdra
On 19 February 2016 it was announced that Bonev had joined the B Group team Lokomotiv 2012 Mezdra.

Club statistics

References

External links
 

1994 births
Living people
Bulgarian footballers
First Professional Football League (Bulgaria) players
Second Professional Football League (Bulgaria) players
PFC Ludogorets Razgrad II players
FC Pirin Razlog players
PFC Vidima-Rakovski Sevlievo players
PFC Marek Dupnitsa players
PFC Lokomotiv Mezdra players
FC Lokomotiv 1929 Sofia players
Association football midfielders
Place of birth missing (living people)